The Frances Jane Longden Almshouses were erected in 1852 in Bramcote, Nottinghamshire, for 4 poor women.

The patron was Frances Jane Longden, the sister of John Sherwin Gregory of Bramcote Manor. She endowed the almshouses to provide accommodation for four poor women of the parish who were to receive two shillings weekly and two tons of coal each year. The datestone is located just off centre of the building with the wording “Almshouses erected by Frances Jane Longden 1852”

The almshouses are situated at the top of Cow Lane, Bramcote.

Nottingham Community Housing Association assumed ownership in 2007, and the independent charity 244900 which had formerly managed the housing was closed.

See also
Listed buildings in Bramcote

References

Almshouses in Nottinghamshire
Grade II listed buildings in Nottinghamshire
Buildings and structures in Nottingham
Residential buildings completed in 1852
Grade II listed almshouses
1852 establishments in England